Sachiko Fujita (born January 9, 1968) is a Japanese former volleyball and beach volleyball player who competed in the 1988 Summer Olympics and in the 1996 Summer Olympics.

In 1988 she finished third with the Japanese team in the Olympic tournament.

Eight years later she finished fifth with her partner Yukiko Takahashi in the 1996 beach volleyball tournament.

External links
 sports-reference.com

1968 births
Living people
Japanese women's volleyball players
Japanese beach volleyball players
Women's beach volleyball players
Olympic volleyball players of Japan
Olympic beach volleyball players of Japan
Volleyball players at the 1988 Summer Olympics
Beach volleyball players at the 1996 Summer Olympics